Porro is a Colombian musical style and dance.

Porro may refer also to:

Places
Porro Bluff, Graham Land, Antarctica
Porro, Kenya, a village

Other uses 
Porro (surname)
Porro prism, a type of prism arrangement in a set of binoculars that serves to invert a visual image 
Porron or porró, a traditional Spanish glass wine pitcher